Stylurus townesi, the Townes's clubtail, is a species of dragonfly in the family Gomphidae. It is endemic in the United States.  Its natural habitat is rivers.

References 

Insects of the United States
Gomphidae
Taxonomy articles created by Polbot
Insects described in 1936